Vampire is a 1979 American made-for-television horror film directed by E. W. Swackhamer, co-written and produced by Steven Bochco, and starring Richard Lynch, Jason Miller, E. G. Marshall, Kathryn Harrold, Jessica Walter, and Joe Spinell.

Premise
A handsome millionaire vampire with an irresistible power over women becomes hunted by two vampire killers in modern-day San Francisco.

Cast
 Richard Lynch as Anton Voytek
 Jason Miller as John Rawlins
 E. G. Marshall as Harry Kilcoyne
 Kathryn Harrold as Leslie Rawlins
 Jessica Walter as Nicole DeCamp
 Barrie Youngfellow as Andrea Parker 
 Michael Tucker as Christopher Bell 
 Jonelle Allen as Brandy
 Scott Paulin as Father Hanley
 Joe Spinell as Captain Desher

References

External links

American television films
1979 horror films
1979 television films
1979 films
ABC network original films
American thriller films
American supernatural horror films
American vampire films
1970s English-language films
1970s thriller films
American horror television films
Vampires in television
Films scored by Fred Karlin
MTM Enterprises films
Films directed by E. W. Swackhamer
1970s American films